Governor Tyler may refer to:

James Hoge Tyler (1846–1925), 43rd Governor of Virginia
John Tyler Sr. (1747–1813), 15th Governor of Virginia
John Tyler (1790–1862), 23rd Governor of Virginia before becoming the tenth president of the United States